The Bibliothèque du Patrimoine de Clermont Auvergne Métropole is a public library in Clermont-Ferrand, France. Among the sixteen libraries of Clermont Auvergne Métropole Library System, this library is dedicated to Auvergne.
Classified for its old, rare or precious collections, the library is also a regional documentation library which works in conjunction with the Bibliothèque nationale de France to ensure the collection by legal deposit and the conservation of books and periodicals printed in Auvergne.

History 
During the French revolution confiscations were made from the religious communities and from emigrants living in the region.
First opened to the public in 1793, the municipal library was moved to the hôpital des frères de la Charité in 1800 and joined a new building to be part of the Bibliothèque municipale et universitaire in 1905. In 1994, the Heritage and Local History Library moves into a new building, rue Bardoux. It will be moved in 2024 in the listed 18th century Hôtel-Dieu hospital building to create a new 11000m2 Clermont Auvergne Metropolitan Library with an outdoor reading garden.

Collections 
This Heritage and Local History Library houses about 170,000 volumes : more than 3,700 linear meters of manuscripts, books, periodicals, but also engravings, maps and plans, photographs, and more.

Access and services 
The Library is located at 17 rue Bardoux. It is open to the public every day, except Sundays, from 9:00 until 19:00. It is closed each summer from August 1 until August 31. 
A digital library, called "Overnia", provides online access to digitized collections.

References

Bibliography

External links 

 
 Overnia Digital Library

Libraries in Auvergne-Rhône-Alpes
Public libraries in France